The Crafoord Prize is an annual science prize established in 1980 by Holger Crafoord, a Swedish industrialist, and his wife Anna-Greta Crafoord. The Prize is awarded in partnership between the Royal Swedish Academy of Sciences and the Crafoord Foundation in Lund. The Academy is responsible for selecting the Crafoord Laureates. The prize is awarded in four categories: astronomy and mathematics; geosciences; biosciences, with particular emphasis on ecology; and polyarthritis, the disease from which Holger severely suffered in his last years.

According to the Academy, "these disciplines are chosen so as to complement those for which the Nobel Prizes are awarded". Only one award is given each year, according to a rotating scheme – astronomy and mathematics; then geosciences; then biosciences. A Crafoord Prize in polyarthritis is only awarded when a special committee decides that substantial progress in the field has been made. The recipient of the Crafoord Prize is announced each year in mid-January; on Crafoord Days in April or May, the prize is presented by the King of Sweden, who also presents the Nobel Prizes at the ceremony in December.  the prize money is 6,000,000 kr (or US$700,000).

The inaugural laureates, Vladimir Arnold and Louis Nirenberg, were cited by the Academy for their work in the field of non-linear differential equations. As of 2022, the winners have predominantly been men. The first woman to be awarded the prize was astronomer Andrea Ghez in 2012.

Laureates 

The Crafoord prize has been awarded to the following scientists:

Notes
 Nirenberg was born in Canada.

 Grothendieck was born in Germany, but spent most of his life in France and was legally stateless. He declined his prize.

 Shing-Tung Yau was born in China.

 Dziewonski was born in Poland.

 Kontsevich was born in Russia.

 Eliashberg was born in Russia.

 Rudensky was born in Russia.

See also 

 List of general science and technology awards 
 The Kyoto Prize
 Prizes named after people

References

External links 

 
 Crafoord Prize at Royal Swedish Academy of Sciences website

Awards established in 1980
Awards of the Royal Swedish Academy of Sciences